A fixed feast is an annual celebration that is held on the same calendar date every year, such as Christmas, as distinguished from moveable feasts, such as Easter, whose calendar date varies.

Christian festivals and holy days